Kesharkhi (also Romanized as Kesharkhī; also known as Keshākhī) is a village in Yowla Galdi Rural District, in the Central District of Showt County, West Azerbaijan Province, Iran. At the 2006 census, its population was 754, in 172 families.

References 

Populated places in Showt County